Aigagalefili Fepulea'i Tapua'i (born ) is a Samoan-New Zealander poet, indigenous, and climate change activist. She is the daughter of former Samoan MP Seminare Fepulea’i.

Biography 

Fepulea'i Tapua'i was born in South Auckland and educated at Aorere College. In 2019 she organised Pasefika climate change group 4 Tha Kulture and participated in the 2019 climate strikes. The story of her climate activism is documented in the film High Tide Don’t Hide. In March 2020 she was selected to represent New Zealand at the Global Young Leaders Conference in New York City.

During the COVID-19 pandemic she spoke out about racial inequality in education and how the pandemic had forced Pasefika students to leave school to support their families. During the 2020 election campaign she was invited to participate in the leader's debate.

Recognition
In November 2020 she was awarded the Young Leader award in the New Zealand Women of Influence Awards. In December 2020 she was awarded the supreme award for youth advocacy at the inaugural Pacific Cooperation Foundation Youth Leadership Awards. In 2021 she was nominated for the New Zealander of the Year Awards in the "local hero" category.

References

2000s births
Living people
New Zealand poets
Youth climate activists
New Zealand women environmentalists
Indigenous activists of Oceania
New Zealand people of Samoan descent
Year of birth missing (living people)
People educated at Aorere College
People from Auckland